Indus Kohistanis are an Indo-Aryan ethnolinguistic group speaking the Maiya language. They are located in Indus Kohistan, in northern Pakistan.

History 
Inhabiting the region of Indus Kohistan, the Kohistani formerly practiced Hinduism and Buddhism, until the 15th century, when the Kohistani started converting to Islam. A Glossary of the Tribes and Castes of the Punjab and North-West Frontier Province thus notes that their neighbours, "The Pathans call them, and all other Muhammadans of Indian descent in the Hindu Kush valleys, Kohistanis."

During the winter, the Kohistani people reside near their fields, while in the summer they migrate to camping grounds that are located 14,000 feet in altitude.

See also
Maiyã language

References

Ethnic groups in Pakistan
Dardic peoples
Indo-Aryan peoples